The Australasian Breeders Crown is a futurity harness racing series for horses bred in Australia and New Zealand. The series is for two, three and four-year-old pacers and trotters.

It is held on a Sunday in late August at Tabcorp Park in Melton, Victoria.

Run by Harness Racing Victoria, the 2011 Australasian Breeders Crown will be held on Sunday 21 August, featuring 10 races and $1.56 million of stake money on offer.

Winners
 2002	Australasian Breeders Crown (2YO) -	Kyvalley Road
 2003	Australasian Breeders Crown (3YO) -	Kyvalley Road
 2006	Australasian Breeders Crown (3YO) -	Right Interest
 2007	Australasian Breeders Crown (Open) - 	Sundons Gift
 2008	Australasian Breeders Crown (3YO) -	Skyvalley
 2008	Australasian Breeders Crown (Open) -	Sundons Gift
 2009	Australasian Breeders Crown (3YO) -	Let Me Thru
 2009	Australasian Breeders Crown (4YO) -	Skyvalley
 2010	Australasian Breeders Crown (4YO) -	Let Me Thru
 2010	Australasian Breeders Crown (Open) -	Sundons Gift

References

External links
 Official Australasian Breeders Crown Website

Harness racing in Australia